Charbonnier is a surname, meaning "someone who sales or makes charcoal", and may refer to;
 Gaëtan Charbonnier (born 1988), French footballer
 Janine Charbonnier (born 1926), French composer
 Jean-Baptiste Charbonnier (1764–1859), composer and organist
 Jean-Baptiste-Frézal Charbonnier (1842–1888), a Catholic missionary who was Vicar Apostolic of Tanganyika from January 1887 to March 1888
 Jean-François Charbonnier (1959–2020), French footballer
 Jean-Philippe Charbonnier (1921–2004), French photographer
 Lionel Charbonnier (born 1966), French football coach
 Louis Charbonnier (1754–1833), French general during the French Revolutionary Wars
 Nicolas Charbonnier (born 1981), French sailor and Olympic athlete
 Prosper Charbonnier (1862–1936), French naval officer and ballistics expert
 Stéphane Charbonnier (1967–2015), French caricaturist and journalist

French-language surnames
Occupational surnames